Domingo Massaguè Casasayas (4 December 1900 – 17 August 1979) was a Spanish footballer who played as a defender for FC Barcelona.

Club career
Born in Barcelona, he began playing football in 1914, in the children's school of Unió Deportiva Terrassa. He mainly stood out at Terrassa FC, a club where he played for more than a decade and was one of its most prominent pillars. He played a crucial role in helping the club win the Catalan Primera Championship (Second division) in the 1923–24 season and the 1925 Copa Catalunya. His constant series of solid defensive performances eventually earned him a move to FC Barcelona at the end of the 1920s, ​​a club with which he played 10 friendly matches and with the reserve team. He finished his career at UE Sants.

International career
Like many other Catalan players of his time, he was eligible to play for the Catalonia national team, and he was summoned several times, forming defensive partnerships with the likes of Joaquín Montané, Ricardo Saprissa or Pedro Serra. He helped the Catalan team win the 1923–24 Prince of Asturias Cup, an inter-regional competition organized by the RFEF. Montané was a starter in the replay of the infamous final of the 1923–24 edition against a Castile/Madrid XI, where Catalonia came out as 3–2 winners.

Honours

Club
UE Sants
 Catalan Championship Second division: 1923–24

 Copa Catalunya: 1925

Catalonia
 Prince of Asturias Cup: 1923–24

References

1900 births
1979 deaths
Footballers from Barcelona
Spanish footballers
Association football defenders
Terrassa FC footballers
FC Barcelona players
La Liga players
Catalonia international footballers